Thorpe St Peter is a village and civil parish in the East Lindsey district of Lincolnshire, England, about  north-west from the town of Wainfleet.

Thorpe is listed in the Domesday Book of 1086 as having 33 households, two mills and a church.

The parish church, dedicated to Saint Peter is a Grade I listed building dating from 1200 with later additions and alterations, and restored in the 19th century. It is built of greenstone and limestone. The west tower dates from the mid-14th century, and there is an early 13th-century font.

Thorpe Culvert railway station was opened here in 1873.

Sport
Thorpe St Peter is home to the Wainfleet & District Sporting Motorcycle Club. It hosts Motorcycle Grasstrack Racings International Lincolnshire Poacher and in 2011 held the European Grasstrack Championship Final.

References

External links

East Lindsey District
Civil parishes in Lincolnshire
Villages in Lincolnshire